Zebennus was a third-century bishop and Christian Martyr from Palaestina Prima (Modern Israel).

Little is known about his early life, career or episcopacy in Eleutheropolis, however, he is credited that during his episcopacy he had a dream revealing the burial place of Micah and Habbakuk.

He was martyred, executed on the Ides of November, with two others, Germanus and Antoninus a presbyter. Their feast day is November 13.

References

3rd-century Christian martyrs
Year of birth unknown
3rd-century bishops in the Roman Empire
3rd-century Romans
3rd-century Christian saints
Saints from the Holy Land
Year of death unknown